Emarginula christiaensi is a species of sea snail, a marine gastropod mollusk in the family Fissurellidae, the keyhole limpets and slit limpets.

Description
This marine shell measures 15.4 mm.

Distribution
This species occurs in the Atlantic Ocean off the Western Sahara.

References

 Biondi F. & Di Paco G. (1996). Living specimens of Emarginula christiaensi Piani, 1985 found in the Mediterranean (Ligurian Sea) (Archeogastropoda: Fissurellidae). La Conchiglia 278: 17-20
 Hoffman L. & Freiwald A. (2018). Last snails standing: a tale of Fissurellidae (Gastropoda) from deep-water coral habitats off Mauritania since the Pleistocene. Miscellanea Malacologica. 7(6): 115-126.

External links
 Locard A. (1897-1898). Expéditions scientifiques du Travailleur et du Talisman pendant les années 1880, 1881, 1882 et 1883. Mollusques testacés. Paris, Masson. vol. 1 [1897, p. 1-516 pl. 1-22; vol. 2 [1898], p. 1-515, pl. 1-18]
 ofas, S.; Luque, Á. A.; Templado, J.; Salas, C. (2017). A national checklist of marine Mollusca in Spanish waters. Scientia Marina. 81(2) : 241-254, and supplementary online material
 Piani P. (1985). Revisione del genere Emarginula Lamarck, 1801 in Mediterraneo. Lavori, Società Italiana di Malacologia 21: 193-238
  Serge GOFAS, Ángel A. LUQUE, Joan Daniel OLIVER,José TEMPLADO & Alberto SERRA (2021) - The Mollusca of Galicia Bank (NE Atlantic Ocean); European Journal of Taxonomy 785: 1–114
 To Biodiversity Heritage Library (8 publications)
 To World Register of Marine Species

Fissurellidae
Gastropods described in 1898